Roldós is a surname. Notable people with the surname include:

 Jaime Roldós Aguilera (1940–1981), President of Ecuador (1979–81)
 León Roldós Aguilera, Vice President of Ecuador (1981–1984)
 Martha Roldós (born 1963), Ecuadorian economist and politician, daughter of Jaime